Barbara Elżbieta Piwnik (born 5 March 1955) is a Polish judge. She served as Minister of Justice of Poland from 2001 to 2002.

Career
A judge by profession, on 19 October 2001, Piwnik was appointed Minister of Justice in the cabinet headed by Prime Minister Leszek Miller. She was an independent member of the cabinet. In July 2002, Prime Minister Miller requested her resignation. 

Piwnik's term ended on 6 July 2002 and she was succeeded by Grzegorz Kurczuk as Minister of Justice.

References

1955 births
20th-century Polish judges
Women government ministers of Poland
Justice ministers of Poland
Living people
Female justice ministers
Polish prosecutors
People from Ostrowiec County
University of Warsaw alumni
Scholars of criminal law
Recipients of the Order of Polonia Restituta